Wilson Leal Dos Ramos (born 24 February 1983), commonly known as Kilson, is a São Toméan footballer who plays as a midfielder for Sporting Praia Cruz and the São Tomé and Príncipe national team.

International career
Kilson made his international debut for São Tomé and Príncipe in 2015.

References

1983 births
Living people
Association football midfielders
São Tomé and Príncipe footballers
São Tomé and Príncipe international footballers
Sporting Praia Cruz players